In Paraguay is a 2008 documentary film directed and shot by Ross McElwee, about his family's process to adopt a Paraguayan infant girl named Mariah.

Reception
Ronnie Scheib of Variety wrote that “In Paraguay” feels atypically passive — a homemovie [sic] whose shape and substance are devoid of the helmer’s familiar wry commentary", and that McElwee's "impudence is subdued by his first exploration of abject poverty, so much so that even the intricacies of Latin American bureaucracy fail to engage his satiric imagination".

References

External links
In Paraguay at IMDb

2008 films
American documentary films
Films shot in Paraguay
Films directed by Ross McElwee
2000s American films